James Kidd may refer to:

 James Kidd (politician) (1872–1928), Unionist Party politician in Scotland
 James Kidd (prospector) (1879–1949), American prospector who disappeared in 1949
 James Hutton Kidd (1877–1945), New Zealand horticulturist and community leader
 Jimmy Kidd, English footballer